= List of mayors of Florence, South Carolina =

Mayor of Florence
- Incumbent; Lethonia Bradley Barnes since November 12, 2024
- Term length: Four years (formerly two)
- Inaugural holder: Jerome P. Chase
- Formation: 1871 (position); 1890 (title)
- Website: Office of the Mayor

This is a list of the mayors of Florence, South Carolina. Intendant was the original position of the head of the town, which was chartered in 1871. Jerome P. Chase, the founder of the town, served as its first intendant, and is known as the "father of Florence." Chase had been appointed to the position, and his successor, D.W. Haines, was voted in by election, rather than appointment. The position of Intendant transferred to that of Mayor between 1890 and 1893.

== List ==
Mayors of Florence, South Carolina
#	Name	Term Start	Term End	Party	Source
1	Jerome P. Chase	1871	1872		
2	D.W. Haines	1872	1873		
3	John Kuker	1873	1874		
(2)	D.W. Haines	1874	1877		
4	W.J. Norris	1877	1888		
5	William Alexander Brunson	1880	1882		
6	Z.T. Kershaw	1882	1883		
7	W.H. Day	1883	1886		
(5)	W.A. Brunson	1886	1888		
7	W.H. Day	1888	1890		
Title transfer from that of superintendant to that of mayor
(1)	Jerome P. Chase	1890	1893		
8	W.W. Hursey	1893	1895		
(7)	W.H. Day	1895	1899		
9	William Herbert Malloy	1899	1905		
10	W.J. Brown	1905	1907		
11	Herbert King Gilbert	1907	1913		
12	William R. Barringer	1913	1917		
(11)	Herbert King Gilbert	1917	1921		
(12)	William R. Barringer	1921	1923		
13	W.M. Waters	1923	April 14, 1925		
(11)	Herbert King Gilbert	April 14, 1925	April 24, 1935		
14	Dexter Ernest Ellerbe	April 24, 1935	April 30, 1942		
15	James R. Schipman	April 30, 1942	May 10, 1943		
16	R.F. Zeigler	May 10, 1943	May 6, 1947		
17	Haskell M. Thomas	May 6, 1947	May 1, 1951		
(15)	James R. Schipman	May 1, 1951	May 3, 1955		
18	David H. McLeod	May 3, 1955	May 4, 1971	Democrat	
19	C. Cooper Tedder	May 4, 1971	May 3, 1983	Democrat	
20	Joe W. "Rocky" Pearce	May 3, 1983	May 10, 1991	Democrat	
21	Haigh Porter	May 10, 1991	May 2, 1995	Democrat	
22	Frank Willis	May 2, 1995	November 9, 2008	Democrat	
23	Steve Wukela, Jr.	November 9, 2008	November 3, 2020	Democrat	
24	Teresa Myers-Ervin	November 3, 2020	November 12, 2024	Democrat	
25	Lethonia Bradley Barnes	November 12, 2024	Incumbent	Democrat	

== Sources ==
- Harrison, Brenda; Leach, Jennifer (2004). Florence. Arcadia Publishing. pp. 25–28. ISBN 978-0-7385-1609-7.
